D. W. Wilson (David William) (born 1985) is a Canadian author born in Cranbrook, British Columbia. He is the author of the short story collection, Once You Break A Knuckle published under Penguin Books Ltd in Canada and Bloomsbury in the UK. It had positive press from Canadian and UK media sources including CBC News, The Globe and Mail, and The Guardian.

Wilson studied creative writing at the University of East Anglia (MA 2010; PhD 2013). His debut full-length novel, Ballistics, was published in spring 2013.

Awards and honors
2011 BBC National Short Story Award, "The Dead Roads" from Once You Break A Knuckle 
2012 Dylan Thomas Prize, shortlist, Once You Break A Knuckle 
2013 Waterstones 11, Ballistics

References

Writers from British Columbia
People from Cranbrook, British Columbia
Canadian children's writers
Living people
Alumni of the University of East Anglia
1985 births
Canadian male short story writers
Canadian male novelists
21st-century Canadian novelists
21st-century Canadian short story writers
21st-century Canadian male writers